James Firth VC (15 January 1874 – 29 May 1921) was an English recipient of the Victoria Cross, the highest and most prestigious award for gallantry in the face of the enemy that can be awarded to British and Commonwealth forces.

Early life and family
He was born in Sheffield, son of Charles Firth, steel smelter, of Sheffield, later residing in Jarrow-on-Tyne, and Elizabeth Lister also of Sheffield. He joined the Army on 29 July 1889. in June 1897 he married Florence Edwards of Swineshead, Lincolnshire (born 1876) and they had three children: Joseph Wallis Firth, born 1902 (died in 1912, after choking on a playing marble), Alleyne Gatehouse Firth, born 25 June 1903, and Cecil James Firth, born 18 December 1907.

Military career
Firth was 26 years old, and a sergeant in the 1st Battalion, The Duke of Wellington's (West Riding) Regiment, British Army during the Second Boer War when the following deed took place on 24 February 1900 near Arundel, Cape Colony for which he was awarded the VC:

He returned to the United Kingdom in early 1901, and received the VC from King Edward VII during an investiture at Marlborough House 25 July 1901.

Death

He died of tuberculosis in May 1921 and is buried at Burngreave Cemetery, Sheffield.

The medal
The medal is in the Lord Ashcroft Collection.

References
Notes

Bibliography
Monuments to Courage (David Harvey, 1999)
The Register of the Victoria Cross (This England, 1997)
Victoria Crosses of the Anglo-Boer War (Ian Uys, 2000)

External links
Location of grave and VC medal (South Yorkshire)
VC medal auction details
 

Duke of Wellington's Regiment soldiers
Second Boer War recipients of the Victoria Cross
British recipients of the Victoria Cross
1874 births
1921 deaths
British Army personnel of the Second Boer War
20th-century deaths from tuberculosis
British Army recipients of the Victoria Cross
Tuberculosis deaths in England
Military personnel from Sheffield